Cortier is a surname. Notable people with this name include:

Benoit Cortier, French race car driver in the 2004 Formula Renault seasons
Lucien Cortier, fictional character in The Face at the Window (1939 film)
Véronique Cortier, French mathematician and computer scientist

See also
Poste Maurice Cortier, a train stop in Algeria